Abu Akash was an Al-Qaeda operative. He was believed to have been killed in a drone attack in Asori village in North Waziristan on 31 October 2008.  However, he managed to escape safely. He was known by aliases Haji Akasha Khan, Abdur Rehman and Iraqi Malang. He was born in Iraq. He came to notoriety in 2007 when he released a video calling for attacks on coalition forces.  Sources said Abu Akash was Al Qaeda’s chief of financial affairs in the region and set up his headquarters in Mir Ali, Pakistan.  One of his sons was killed in a drone attack previously on 30 November 2005. Abu Akash was killed in another drone attack on 24 September 2012.

See also
 War on Terror

References

Year of birth missing
2012 deaths
Assassinated al-Qaeda members
Deaths by United States drone strikes in Pakistan
Iraqi al-Qaeda members
Iraqi expatriates in Pakistan